Đạ Tẻh is a rural district (huyện) of Lâm Đồng province in the Central Highlands region of Vietnam. As of 2003 the district had a population of 48,590. The district covers an area of 524 km². The district capital lies at Đạ Tẻh.

References

Districts of Lâm Đồng province